William Frazier (October 6, 1833 – October 2, 1902) was a member of the Wisconsin State Assembly.

Biography
Frazier was born on October 6, 1833 in Belmont County, Ohio. He married Plume Powell in 1855. They would have eleven children.

Career
Frazier was a member of the Assembly in 1874 as a Republican. Other positions he held include Chairman of the Vernon County, Wisconsin and of the Jefferson, Vernon County, Wisconsin.

References

1833 births
1902 deaths
People from Belmont County, Ohio
People from Vernon County, Wisconsin
Republican Party members of the Wisconsin State Assembly
County supervisors in Wisconsin
19th-century American politicians